Sapahar Pilot High School is a secondary school at Sapahar in Sapahar Upazila, Naogaon District, Bangladesh, established in 1962.
It is one of the best high school in Sapahar Upazila. In 2012, the school celebrated its fiftieth anniversary. EIIN of this institution is 123750.

See also
 Sapahar Government College
 Al-Helal Islami Academy & College, Sapahar, Naogaon

References

 

High schools in Bangladesh
Schools in Naogaon District
1962 establishments in East Pakistan
Educational institutions established in 1962